Casa Ulanga, also known as the former Superior Court of Arecibo (Spanish: Antiguo Tribunal Superior de Arecibo), is a historic building located at 7 Gonzalo Marín Street in the historic center of the Puerto Rican municipality of Arecibo. Due to its historic and architectural importance the building was added to the United States National Register of Historic Places on July 26, 1982.

History 
Originally constructed as a dwelling for Don Francisco Ulanga in 1850, its prominent location near the town square, and its three-story construction made the building notable and important to the historical development of Arecibo. The structure housed the family residence in its first and second stories. The basement level, facing Ariosto Cruz Street, was the locale for a bank and a trade center. Throughout its history the building was also used as a store, a hospital, a jail, municipal offices and, currently, a cultural center known as the Arecibo House of Culture (Casa de la Cultura Arecibeña).

References 

National Register of Historic Places in Arecibo, Puerto Rico
1850 establishments in Puerto Rico
Residential buildings completed in 1850
Ulanga
Commercial buildings on the National Register of Historic Places in Puerto Rico
Courthouses on the National Register of Historic Places in Puerto Rico
Commercial buildings completed in 1850
Cultural centers